Bruno Lüdke (3 April 1908 – 8 April 1944) was a German alleged serial killer. Police officials connected him to at least 51 murder victims, mainly women, killed in a 15-year period, which began in 1928 and ended with his arrest in 1943. He was never given a trial, and is considered as innocent.

Arrest
Born in Köpenick, Lüdke had a mild intellectual disability (he could not, for example, tell interrogators how many minutes there were in an hour) and worked as a coachman. He was well known by the local police as a petty thief and peeping tom. On 31 January 1943 a woman was found murdered in the woods near Köpenick, strangled with her own shawl. The victim showed signs of post-mortem sexual abuse and her purse was missing. Police brought in Lüdke for questioning on 18 March 1943, where he quickly confessed to murdering not only the woman but also several other victims, and was taken into custody. Witnesses report Lüdke showed signs of physical abuse and he stated that "they would kill me if I didn't confess".
 
Lüdke was never put on trial for any of the killings. Declared insane, he was sent to the SS-run Institute of Criminological Medicine in Vienna, where medical experiments were carried out on him until his death, when an experiment went wrong in 1944.

Controversy
The 50-odd crime scenes showed no similarities in modus operandi, signature, or motive. No fingerprints were ever found and no evidence against Lüdke has ever been presented.

A Dutch former Chief of police named Jan Blaauw investigated original police reports, finding them inconclusive, incoherent, and vague. He also expressed his disbelief that a semi-illiterate, who once got caught stealing a chicken, could evade authorities for nearly 20 years, let alone get away with murder.

Many believe Lüdke to be the victim of a frame-up, carried out by an ambitious Kriminalkommissar (Detective Captain) Franz, the heavily censored Reichskriminalpolizeiamt, and the Nazi government, that had little patience with people with intellectual disabilities. 

A 1957 movie, Nachts, wenn der Teufel kam, doubted Lüdke as one of Germany's worst serial killers. Attempts at reopening the case by members of the Kriminalrat (Detective Major) Faulhaber yielded no results. The true nature of the 51 murders remains unsolved.

See also
 List of serial killers by number of victims

References

1908 births
1944 deaths
German serial killers
Male serial killers
Murdered serial killers
Necrophiles
People killed by Nazi Germany
People from Treptow-Köpenick